Luis Morales Scott (born 4 March 1964) is a retired Puerto Rican sprinter who specialized in the 100 and 200 metres.

He competed in both 100 and 200 metres at the 1984 Olympic Games, and reached the semi-final in both events. He won the silver medal in the 100 metres at the 1987 Central American and Caribbean Championships.

His personal best time in the 100 metres was 10.28 seconds, achieved in May 1987 in Westwood, Los Angeles, California. His personal best time in the 200 metres was 20.44 seconds, achieved in May 1987 in Corvallis.

See also
Puerto Rican records in track and field
Luis Morales ran for USC between 1982 - 1987. Won the Pac 10 titles in the 100m and 200m while attending USC. Personal Best in the 100 meters is 10.21 which he ran while competing for USC May 14, 1983. This time of 10.21 was run at the Modesto Invitational in Modesto, Ca. Luis Morales 10.21 in the 100 meters was run at sea level and it became the Puerto Rico National record. Luis Morales is still currently the Puerto Rico National record holder in the 100 meters because his time of 10.21 was run at sea level. Only sea level times or altitude times converted to sea level are considered for record purposes according to the IAAF rules. The IAAF is that govern body of track and field. Luis Morales 200 meter time of 20.44 is still currently the Puerto Rico National record and has been since 1987.  
USC Men's Top 10 Performers - Link
http://grfx.cstv.com/photos/schools/usc/sports/c-track/auto_pdf/2012-13/misc_non_event/m-top-10-2013.pdf

References

1964 births
Living people
Puerto Rican male sprinters
Olympic track and field athletes of Puerto Rico
Athletes (track and field) at the 1984 Summer Olympics
Athletes (track and field) at the 1987 Pan American Games
Pan American Games competitors for Puerto Rico